School of Economic Affairs (SEA) is an institute of higher education in Iran.

External links
Official website

Economy of Iran